Paul J. Shelley (born July 11, 1959) is a former political figure in Newfoundland and Labrador, Canada. He represented Baie Verte-Springdale in the Newfoundland and Labrador House of Assembly from 1993 to 2007 as a Progressive Conservative.

He was born in Baie Verte, the son of William Shelley, and was educated at Memorial University. Shelley worked in construction from 1977 to 1981, was technical director of the Newfoundland and Labrador Basketball Association from 1986 to 1987 and taught school in Baie Verte from 1987 to 1989. Shelley married Beverly Whitten. He served in the provincial cabinet as Minister Tourism, Culture and Recreation and Minister of Human Resources, Labour and Employment. Shelley resigned his seat in July 2007, citing family reasons.

References 

1959 births
Living people
Progressive Conservative Party of Newfoundland and Labrador MHAs
21st-century Canadian politicians
Members of the Executive Council of Newfoundland and Labrador
Memorial University of Newfoundland alumni